"Si t'étais là" is a song by french singer Louane. It was released on 21 October 2017 as the second single from her second studio album Louane. The song has peaked at number two on the French Singles Chart.

Charts

Weekly charts

Year-end charts

Certifications

References

2017 singles
2017 songs
French-language songs
Louane (singer) songs